Shelby station is a station stop for the Amtrak Empire Builder line in Shelby, Montana. Near U.S. Highway 2, the station is adjacent to downtown Shelby.  The station, platform, and parking are owned by BNSF Railway.

Continuing passengers on both westbound and eastbound Empire Builder are allowed to step off the train at Shelby. Due to "padding" in the westbound schedule, if the westbound Empire Builder is on-time into Shelby, the stop in Shelby can be as long as a train service stop.

References

External links 

Shelby station – USA RailGuide (TrainWeb)

Amtrak stations in Montana
Buildings and structures in Toole County, Montana
Former Great Northern Railway (U.S.) stations
1893 establishments in Montana
Railway stations in the United States opened in 1893